Cuauhtémoc Salgado Romero (born 1 March 1965) is a Mexican politician from the Institutional Revolutionary Party. From 2009 to 2012 he served as Deputy of the LXI Legislature of the Mexican Congress representing Guerrero, as well as a local deputy in the Congress of Guerrero.

References

1965 births
Living people
Politicians from Guerrero
Institutional Revolutionary Party politicians
21st-century Mexican politicians
People from Ciudad Altamirano, Guerrero
Autonomous University of Mexico State alumni
20th-century Mexican politicians
Members of the Congress of Guerrero
Deputies of the LXI Legislature of Mexico
Members of the Chamber of Deputies (Mexico) for Guerrero